The 2020 Campeonato Cearense was the 106th season of Ceará's top football league. Fortaleza won the league for the 43rd time.

Format
First Round
All the eight teams play each other once.
The top six teams go to the Second round.
The bottom two teams are relegated.
Second Round
The eight teams play each other once.
The top four teams go the Finals round.
Final Rounds
The four teams are split according to the final standings and play semi-final match.
The two semi-final winners will compete in the final to determine the 2020 Campeonato Cearense winners.

Teams

First round

Second round

Final rounds

Semi-finals

Final

References

2020 in Brazilian football
Campeonato Cearense